The women's triple jump competition at the 2018 Asian Games was held on 30 August at the Gelora Bung Karno Stadium.

Schedule
All times are Western Indonesia Time (UTC+07:00)

Records

Results
Legend
DNS — Did not start

References

External links
Results

Women's triple jump
2018 Women